Jack Thomas DeGrenier (born February 25, 1951) was an American football running back for the New Orleans Saints of the National Football League. He was signed by the New Orleans Saints in 1973. He played college football at Northern Arizona and Texas-Arlington.  DeGernier played one season for the New Orleans Saints in 1974. His son, Chad DeGrenier, played in the Arena Football League.

References

1951 births
Living people
American football running backs
New Orleans Saints players
Northern Arizona Lumberjacks football players
Texas–Arlington Mavericks football players